Mafersa S.A. is a Brazilian manufacturer of passenger rail cars, buses and trolleybuses, and related components. It was founded in 1944 and was located in the city of São Paulo.  At the end of 1997 it became a subsidiary of Alstom.

Most of its customers were in Brazil. However, export orders included, in 1990–92, 38 stainless-steel push-pull commuter rail cars for the Virginia Railway Express (10 control cars [cab-equipped trailers] and 28 trailers) and 256 metro-car bodyshells for the Chicago Transit Authority (as a subcontractor to Morrison-Knudsen).  In the mid-1980s the company built more than 270 metro cars for Rio de Janeiro and more than 400 for São Paulo, and these were built under license from the Budd Company.

In addition to building new rail vehicles, Mafersa also carried out overhauls of existing rail cars.

In 1997, Mafersa was acquired by Alstom.  A subsidiary of Alstom keeping the same name, Mafersa SA, continued producing rail vehicle components (such as wheels and axles), while manufacturing of rail cars also continued but now under the name, "Alstom Transporte do Brazil S.A."  Alstom sold the technology and license of Mafersa SA to MWL Brasil Rodas & Eixos Ltda. in November 1999, and this company continued making rail-vehicle components, initially under the Mafersa name.

Buses
Mafersa entered the field of bus manufacturing in 1985, with development of a bus chassis and a monocoque (or integral) trolleybus. Production of trolleybuses lasted only from 1986 until 1988 and was relatively small, totalling only 85 vehicles, of which  84 were two-axle vehicles and one was articulated. Between the start of production in 1985/86 and 1988 more than 600 diesel buses had been delivered to various cities.

See also

Trolleybuses in Santos
Trolleybuses in São Paulo

References

External links
 MWL Brasil website

Manufacturing companies based in São Paulo
Defunct motor vehicle manufacturers of Brazil
Rolling stock manufacturers of Brazil
Electric vehicle manufacturers of Brazil
Trolleybus manufacturers
Alstom
1944 establishments in Brazil
Vehicle manufacturing companies established in 1944
1997 mergers and acquisitions
Bus manufacturers of Brazil
Budd Company